Eleutherozoa is a proposed subphylum of echinoderms. They are mobile animals with the mouth directed towards the substrate. They usually have a madreporite, tube feet, and moveable spines of some sort, and some have Tiedemann's bodies on the ring canal. All living echinoderms except Crinozoa and Blastozoa belong here.

Systematics
There are 2 main competing hypotheses about the internal subdivision, both about equally well supported by both molecular and morphological data. They differ in their placement of the Ophiuroidea (brittle stars), and are named accordingly.

The "Cryptosyringida" hypothesis posits that the "sea-star" morphology is plesiomorphic for Eleutherozoa as a whole, and that starfish (Asteroidea) and brittle stars are not very closely related, the latter forming the clade Cryptosyringida together with the Echinozoa. The "Asterozoa" hypothesis, on the other hand, implies that the "sea-star" arms of starfish and brittle stars, as well as the rounded shape of Echinozoa, all evolved independently from an ancestor of unknown morphology, but that each "armed" and "rounded" lineage is strictly monophyletic. Too little is known of the basal eleutherozoans and echinoderms to be able to firmly decide for or against any of these hypotheses at present.

The Asterozoa would have to be ranked as a superclass or treated as an unranked clade between the Cryptosyringida and the Eleutherozoa, depending on whether the "Asterozoa" or "Cryptosyringida" hypothesis eventually turns out to be correct.

Some old research favours the following classification:

But more newer research with more advanced technology, favours this cladogram:

Footnotes

References
  (1999): Tree of Life Web Project: Echinodermata: Spiny-skinned animals: sea urchins, starfish, and their allies. Version of 1999-DEC-14. Retrieved 2008-FEB-02.
 Milsom, Clare. Fossils at a glance. Hoboken, NJ: Wiley-Blackwell, 2010.

Echinoderm taxonomy
Extant Cambrian first appearances
Animal subphyla